Hans Joas (born November 27, 1948) is a German sociologist and social theorist.

Hans Joas is Ernst Troeltsch Professor for the Sociology of Religion at the Humboldt University of Berlin. From 2011 until 2014 he was a Permanent Fellow at the Freiburg Institute for Advanced Studies (FRIAS); from 2002 until 2011 he was the Director of the Max Weber Centre for Advanced Cultural and Social Studies at the University of Erfurt. Since 2000 he has also been Visiting Professor of Sociology and Social Thought and a Member of the Committee on Social Thought at the University of Chicago. Hans Joas is Ordinary Member of the Berlin-Brandenburgische Akademie der Wissenschaften.

Life
1968–1971 studying sociology, philosophy, history, German literature at the University of Munich
1971–1972 studying the same disciplines at the Free University of Berlin 
1972 "Diploma" in sociology 
1973–1977 "Wissenschaftlicher Assistent" (Research and teaching fellow), Department of Sociology, Free University of Berlin 
1979 Dr. phil. (Free University of Berlin)
1979–1983 Research Fellow, Max Planck Institute for Human Development and Education, Berlin (1980–1981 Visiting Professor, University of Tübingen) 
1981 Habilitation
1984–1987 Heisenberg Fellow of the German Research Council (Deutsche Forschungsgemeinschaft) 
1985 (Spring quarter) Visiting Professor, Department of Sociology, University of Chicago 
1986 (Summer quarter) Visiting Professor, Department of Sociology, University of Toronto
1987–1990 Professor of Sociology, University of Erlangen‐Nuremberg 
1990–2002 Professor of Sociology, Free University of Berlin 
1993–1995 Executive Director, John F. Kennedy Institute for North American Studies, Berlin 
1992 (Spring semester) Fellow, Swedish Collegium for Advanced Study in the Social Sciences and Visiting Professor, University of Uppsala 
1994 (Fall semester) Fellow, Indiana University Institute for Advanced Study, Bloomington, Indiana 
1996 (Fall semester) Visiting Professor, Department of Sociology, University of Wisconsin at Madison 
1997 (Spring semester) Theodor Heuss Professor, Department of Sociology, New School for Social Research, New York 
1998 (Spring semester) Visiting Professor, Department of Sociology, Duke University, Durham, North Carolina (Fall semester) Visiting Professor, Department of Sociology, University of Wisconsin at Madison 
1999–2000 Fellow, Swedish Collegium for Advanced Study in the Social Sciences, Uppsala, Sweden 
since 2000 Professor, Department of Sociology, University of Chicago, Member of the Committee on Social Thought 
2002–2011 Director, Max Weber Centre for Advanced Cultural and Social Studies, University of Erfurt, Germany 
2002 (Fall semester) Visiting Professor, Department of Sociology, University of Vienna, Austria 
2004–2005 Ernst Cassirer Professor, Swedish Collegium for Advanced Study in the Social Sciences, Uppsala, Sweden 
2005–2006 Fellow, Wissenschaftskolleg zu Berlin 
2007 (Spring semester) Visiting Professor, Department of Sociology and Faculty of Catholic Theology, University of Vienna, Austria 
2010 (Spring semester) Fellow, Swedish Collegium for Advanced Study, Uppsala, Sweden 
2011 (Spring semester) Fellow, Stellenbosch Institute for Advanced Study (STIAS), Stellenbosch, South Africa 
2011–2014 Permanent Fellow, Freiburg Institute for Advanced Studies (FRIAS), University of Freiburg, Germany
2014 (Spring semester) Fellow, Torgny Segerstedt Professor, University of Gothenburg, Sweden  
since 2014 Ernst Troeltsch Professor for the Sociology of Religion, Faculty of Theology, Humboldt University of Berlin
2017 (Spring semester) Fellow, Stellenbosch Institute for Advanced Study (STIAS), Stellenbosch, South Africa
2017 (May) Fellow, Peking University, Institute of Humanities and Social Sciences
2022 (June) International Jakob Fugger Visiting Professorship, University of Augsburg

In 2012 Joas was the first scholar to be Visiting Professor of the Joseph Ratzinger Pope Benedikt XVI. Foundation at the University of Regensburg. The topic of his lectures was "Sacralization and Secularization".

Research
Hans Joas focuses on social philosophy and sociological theory, especially American pragmatism and historicism; sociology of religion and sociology of war and violence; and changing values in modern society.

A particular focus of Joas' research is the emergence of values. To this end, he elaborated a theory of the affirmative genealogy of values, especially of human rights. According to Joas, values emerge in experiences of self-formation and self-transcendence. To this end, he developed a phenomenology of the experience of self-transcendence "from individual prayer to collective ecstasy in archaic rituals or in nationalistic enthusiasm for war"; "it includes moral feelings, the opening of the self in conversation, and in the experience of nature." Joas emphasizes that his consideration of the contingency of the emergence of values should in no way be understood "as a plea against the claims of a universalistic morality."

In a three-volume work, Joas attempts to develop the outline of a global history of moral universalism from these premises. In the first volume, published in 2017, "The Power of the Sacred. An Alternative to the Narrative of Disenchantment," he presented a detailed critique of the historical narrative, going back to Max Weber, of a world-historical process of disenchantment that has been advancing since the Hebrew prophets, and a sketch of an alternative to it. In the second volume, published in 2020, "Im Bannkreis der Freiheit. Religionstheorie nach Hegel and Nietzsche", published in 2020  (English translation forthcoming), is concerned in parallel with overcoming the historical image of a history of religion culminating in Protestant Christianity and its constitutive significance for the constitution of modern political freedom, which goes back to Hegel. In portraits of important philosophical, sociological and theological thinkers on religion, the approaches to an alternative are further substantiated. In the third volume currently in progress (working title "Universalismus. Weltherrschaft und Menschheitsethos"), this alternative is being broadly elaborated historically and sociologically. His most recent book (2022), "Warum Kirche? Selbstoptimierung oder Glaubensgemeinschaft" relates the debates about a new understanding of church and about church reform to this history of moral universalism.

Academic awards
 2010: Bielefelder Wissenschaftspreis ("Niklas-Luhmann-Preis").
 2012: Werner Heisenberg medal of the Alexander von Humboldt-Stiftung.
 2012: Doctor honoris causa, University of Tübingen.
 2013: Doctor honoris causa, Uppsala University.
 2013: Hans-Kilian-Award.
 2015: Distinguished Lifetime Achievement Award, American Sociological Association, Section History of Sociology.
 2015: Max-Planck-Research-Award.
 2017: Prix Paul Ricœur.
 2018: Recipient of the Theological Award Salzburg.
 2022: Recipient of the Distinguished Lifetime Achievement Award of the German Sociological Association.
 2022: Doctor honoris causa, Péter-Pázmány-University Budapest.

Books in English
George Herbert Mead. A Contemporary Re-examination of His Thought (MIT Press 1985).
Social Action and Human Nature (with Axel Honneth) (Cambridge University Press 1988).
Pragmatism and Social Theory (University of Chicago Press 1993, 978-0-226-40042-6).
The Creativity of Action (University of Chicago Press 1996).
The Genesis of Values (University of Chicago Press 2000).
War and Modernity (Blackwell 2003).
Social Theory (with Wolfgang Knoebl) (Cambridge University Press 2009).
Do We Need Religion? On the Experience of Self-Transcendence (Paradigm 2009).
 The Benefit of Broad Horizons: Intellectual and Institutional Preconditions for a Global Social Science (with Barbro Klein) (Brill 2010)
War in Social Thought: Hobbes to the Present  (with Wolfgang Knoebl) (Princeton University Press 2012).
The Sacredness of the Person: A New Genealogy of Human Rights (Georgetown University Press 2012).
The Axial Age and Its Consequences (with Robert Bellah) (Harvard University Press 2012).
Faith as an Option: Possible Futures for Christianity (Stanford University Press 2014).
The Timeliness of George Herbert Mead (with Daniel R. Huebner) (University of Chicago Press 2016).

Books in German
 Was ist die Achsenzeit? Eine wissenschaftliche Debatte als Diskurs über Transzendenz (Schwabe Verlag, Basel 2014).
 Die lange Nacht der Trauer. Erzählen als Weg aus der Gewalt? (Psychosozial-Verlag, Giessen 2015).
 Sind die Menschenrechte westlich? (Kösel, München 2015).
 Kirche als Moralagentur? (Kösel, München 2016).
 Die Macht des Heiligen. Eine Alternative zur Geschichte von der Entzauberung (Suhrkamp, Berlin 2017).
 Im Bannkreis der Freiheit. Religionstheorie nach Hegel und Nietzsche (Suhrkamp 2020, ISBN 978-3-518-58758-4).

References

External links
 
 Homepage Ernst-Troeltsch-Honorarprofessur at the Humboldt-Universität zu Berlin 
 Hans Joas in the central informationsystem of the Humboldt-Universität zu Berlin
 Action Is the Way in Which Human Beings Exist in the World  An interview with Hans Joas, Freie Universität Berlin, September 21st 1999

1948 births
Christian scholars
German male writers
German sociologists
Living people
University of Chicago faculty
Academic staff of the University of Erfurt